The Lotus Evija is a limited production electric sports car to be manufactured by British automobile manufacturer Lotus Cars. Unveiled in July 2019, it is the first electric vehicle to be introduced and manufactured by the company. Codenamed "Type 130" and "Omega", its production will be limited to 130 units.

The Evija prototype underwent high-speed testing in November 2019. A video was released on 21 November 2019 ahead of its debut later that day at the Guangzhou Auto Show. Lotus said it was planning thousands of miles of further road testing, on circuits in Europe and on Lotus's own track at Hethel, England. , production is set to begin in early to mid-2021.

Name
The name Evija is derived from Eve of the Abrahamic religions, a name whose etymology can be traced back to the Biblical Hebrew חי, meaning 'alive', or 'living'. Lotus Cars CEO Phil Popham said: "Evija is the perfect name for our new car because it is the first all-new car to come from Lotus as part of the wider Geely family. With Geely's support we are set to create an incredible range of new cars which are true to the Lotus name and DNA."

Specifications
The Evija is powered by a  battery pack developed in conjunction with Williams Advanced Engineering, with electric motors supplied by Integral Powertrain. It uses Pirelli Trofeo R tyres and AP Racing carbon ceramic disc brakes.

In video games 
 The Evija appears as a playable vehicle in Asphalt 9: Legends, Asphalt 8: Airborne, Project CARS 3, CSR Racing 2, Forza Horizon 5, GRID: Legends, 和平精英,  Grand Theft Auto V , and Real Racing 3''.

Gallery

See also 

 List of production cars by power output

References

External links

Evija
Electric concept cars
Electric sports cars
Cars introduced in 2019
Coupés
All-wheel-drive vehicles
Flagship vehicles
2020s cars
Upcoming car models